A general election was held in the U.S. state of North Dakota on Tuesday, November 2, 2010, with primary elections being held on June 8, 2010.

U.S. Congress

Senate 

Incumbent Democrat Byron Dorgan was eligible to run for re-election to a fourth term but announced in January 2010 that he would not seek reelection, citing his desire to retire and pursue other interests outside of public life. Tracy Potter, a state senator representing Bismarck, won the Democratic-NPL primary while incumbent Governor John Hoeven won the Republican primary and Keith Hanson, a software engineer from West Fargo, won the Libertarian primary. On November 2, 2010, Hoeven won the general election in a landslide with 76.08% of the vote.

House of Representatives 

Incumbent Democrat Earl Pomeroy, who had represented North Dakota in the United States House of Representatives since 1993, ran for re-election and was defeated by Republican nominee Rick Berg, a state representative from Fargo.

Statewide constitutional offices

Secretary of State  

Incumbent Republican Alvin Jaeger ran for re-election to a sixth term as North Dakota Secretary of State and defeated a challenge from Democratic nominee Corey Mock, a state representative from Grand Forks. Jaeger was endorsed by the Grand Forks Herald while Mock was endorsed by The Bismarck Tribune and the AFL–CIO. During the campaign, Jaeger faced criticism over his office's mishandling of a candidate's campaign filings which resulted in them being mistakenly omitted from the June 8 primary election ballot.

Attorney General 

Incumbent Republican Wayne Stenehjem ran for re-election to a fourth term as North Dakota Attorney General and defeated a challenge from Democratic nominee Jeanette Boechler, a personal injury lawyer from Fargo.

Agriculture Commissioner 

Incumbent Republican Doug Goehring ran for election to his first full term as North Dakota Agriculture Commissioner and defeated a challenge from Democratic nominee Merle Boucher, the Democrat minority leader of the North Dakota House of Representatives from Rolette.

Tax Commissioner 

Incumbent Republican Cory Fong ran for re-election to a second term as North Dakota Tax Commissioner and defeated challenges from Democratic nominee Cynthia Kaldor, a businesswoman and former member of the North Dakota State Board of Higher Education from Mayville, and Libertarian nominee Richard Flattum-Riemers.

State Legislature

State Senate

One-half of the seats of the North Dakota Senate are up for election in 2010.

State House of Representatives

One-half of the seats in the North Dakota House of Representatives are up for election in 2010.

Judicial positions
Multiple judicial positions will be up for election in 2010.
North Dakota judicial elections, 2010 at Judgepedia

Ballot measures
One measure has been certified, and at least ten initiatives are pending.
North Dakota 2010 ballot measures at Ballotpedia

Local
Many elections for county offices were held on November 2, 2010.

References

External links
Voting at the North Dakota Secretary of State
U.S. Congress Candidates for North Dakota at Project Vote Smart
North Dakota Election Guide from Congress.org
North Dakota from OurCampaigns.com
North Dakota Polls at Pollster.com

North Dakota Congressional Races in 2010 campaign finance data from OpenSecrets
North Dakota 2010 campaign finance data from Follow the Money

 
North Dakota